San Juan County is located in the U.S. state of New Mexico. As of the 2020 census, the population was 121,661 making it the fifth-most populous county in New Mexico. Its county seat is Aztec. The county was created in 1887.

San Juan County is part of the Farmington, New Mexico, Metropolitan Statistical Area. It is in the state's northwest corner and includes the New Mexico portion of the Four Corners.

Geography
Indian reservations (and off-reservation trust lands) comprise 63.4 percent of the county's land area: The Navajo Nation takes up 60.45% and the Ute Mountain Ute Tribe Reservation another 2.93%.

The physical features include three rivers: the San Juan, Animas, and La Plata rivers; also, the Chuska Mountains and Shiprock Pinnacle to the west, volcanic structures, buttes, mesas, badlands, and fertile river valleys.

Adjacent counties

 Rio Arriba County - east
 Sandoval County - southeast
 McKinley County - south
 Apache County, Arizona - west
 San Juan County, Utah - northwest
 Montezuma County, Colorado - north
 La Plata County, Colorado - north
 Archuleta County, Colorado - northeast

National protected areas
 Aztec Ruins National Monument
 Chaco Culture National Historical Park (part)

Major highways
  U.S. Route 64
  U.S. Route 491 (formerly U.S. Route 666)
  U.S. Route 550
  New Mexico State Road 170
  New Mexico State Road 371
  New Mexico State Road 511
  New Mexico State Road 597(connector to Four Corners Monument)

Demographics

2000 census
At the 2000 census there were 113,801 people, 37,711 households, and 28,924 families living in the county. The population density was 21 people per square mile (8/km2). There were 43,221 housing units at an average density of 8 per square mile (3/km2). The racial makeup of the county was 52.83% White, 0.44% Black or African American, 36.88% Native American, 0.27% Asian, 0.05% Pacific Islander, 6.77% from other races, and 2.78% from two or more races. 14.99% of the population were Hispanic or Latino of any race.
There were 37,712 households, 42.00% had children under the age of 18 living with them, 55.70% were married couples living together, 14.70% had a female head of household with no husband present, and 23.30% were non-families. 19.30% of households were one person and 6.40% were one person aged 65 or older. The average household size was 2.99 and the average family size was 3.43.

The age distribution was 32.60% under the age of 18, 10.00% from 18 to 24, 28.10% from 25 to 44, 20.20% from 45 to 64, and 9.10% 65 or older. The median age was 31 years. For every 100 females there were 98.30 males. For every 100 females age 18 and over, there were 94.70 males.

The median household income was $33,762 and the median family income was $37,382. Males had a median income of $35,066 versus $21,299 for females. The per capita income for the county was $14,282. About 18.00% of families and 21.50% of the population were below the poverty line, including 26.60% of those under age 18 and 18.20% of those age 65 or over.

2010 census
As of the 2010 census, there were 130,044 people, 44,404 households, and 32,457 families living in the county. The racial makeup of the county was 51.6% white, 36.6% American Indian, 0.6% black or African American, 0.4% Asian, 0.1% Pacific islander, 7.3% from other races, and 3.5% from two or more races. Those of Hispanic or Latino origin made up 19.1% of the population. The largest ancestry groups were:

 34.8% Navajo
 15.0% English
 10.7% Mexican
 9.1% German
 5.9% Irish
 4.4% Spanish
 2.8% American
 1.8% French
 1.4% Italian
 1.2% Scottish
 1.1% Scotch-Irish
 1.1% Swedish

Of the 44,404 households, 40.5% had children under the age of 18 living with them, 49.7% were married couples living together, 15.6% had a female householder with no husband present, 26.9% were non-families, and 21.9% of households were made up of individuals. The average household size was 2.89 and the average family size was 3.38. The median age was 33.0 years.

The median household income was $46,189 and the median family income was $53,540. Males had a median income of $44,984 versus $30,245 for females. The per capita income for the county was $20,725. About 15.9% of families and 20.8% of the population were below the poverty line, including 28.0% of those under age 18 and 19.1% of those age 65 or over.

Communities

Cities
 Aztec
 Bloomfield
 Kirtland
 Farmington

Census-designated places

 Angustura
 Beclabito
 Blanco
 Cedar Hill
 Center Point
 Crystal‡
 Flora Vista
 Huerfano (former)
 La Boca
 La Plata
 Lake Valley
 Lee Acres
 Nageezi
 Napi Headquarters
 Naschitti
 Navajo Dam
 Nenahnezad
 Newcomb
 North Light Plant
 Ojo Amarillo
 Sanostee
 Sheep Springs
 Shiprock
 Spencerville
 Totah Vista
 Turley
 Upper Fruitland
 Waterflow
 West Hammond
 White Rock
 Young Place

Other communities
 Fruitland
 Riverside

Politics

Education
School districts include:
 Aztec Municipal Schools
 Bloomfield Municipal Schools
 Central Consolidated Schools
 Farmington Municipal Schools

See also
 Bisti/De-Na-Zin Wilderness
 National Register of Historic Places listings in San Juan County, New Mexico

References

 
1887 establishments in New Mexico Territory
Populated places established in 1887